Rajesh Kumar Borah (born 14 November 1967) is an Indian former first-class cricketer who represented Assam and Railways. He was regarded as "perhaps the finest cricketer Assam has produced." After his playing career, he worked as a coach.

Life and career
A right-handed batsman and right-arm off break bowler, Borah made his first-class debut in 1983 at the age of 16 and represented India Under-19s in the 1986/87 season. He appeared for Assam between 1983/84 and 2000/01 as well as for Railways for two seasons. In 1988, he struck 126 off 62 balls against Tripura in the Ranji Trophy, which is one of the fastest hundreds in Indian domestic cricket. In 66 first-class matches, he amassed more than 3000 runs and took 28 wicket with his part-time bowling. He also appeared for East Zone in Duleep Trophy and Deodhar Trophy.

Borah worked as the coach of Assam during the 2000–01 Ranji Trophy when the team managed to earn qualification for the Elite Group. He then worked as the chief coach at the Assam Cricket Academy. He was appointed as the head coach of Assam for a second time before the 2008–09 season. In 2008, Borah also became a member of the national junior team selection committee.

Currently he is serving as Assistant Sports Officer in Indian Railways.

References

External links 
 
 

1967 births
Living people
Indian cricketers
Assam cricketers
Railways cricketers
East Zone cricketers
People from Sonitpur district
Indian cricket coaches
Cricketers from Assam